Moishe House is an international non-profit organization made up of a collection of homes throughout the world that serve as hubs for the young adult Jewish community (with an emphasis on ages 21–32). It provides a rent subsidy and program budget to Moishe House residents who then use their home to create their ideal Jewish communal space.

Background 
Moishe House was created in Oakland, CA in January 2006 by David Cygielman, Moishe House CEO, and American philanthropist Morris Bear Squire.  Two weeks after opening its first house in Oakland, a second house opened in San Francisco.  The idea for Moishe House came from Cygielman's observation that there was a lack of programming options for Jews who had graduated from college but had not yet settled down with a family.  To fill this void, Moishe House has developed a model for building vibrant, peer-based Jewish communities and learning opportunities designed for Jewish young adults in their 20s.

From its inception until 2008, Moishe House was solely funded by Squire. In 2008, when Squire could no longer support the organization on his own, Cygielman secured non-profit 501(c)3 charity tax status for Moishe House and the organization was then able to start receiving tax-deductible donations and grants.

The concept 
Three to five young adults turn their home into a Moishe House with the financial assistance and guidance of the organization.  In exchange for a rent subsidy, the residents agree to host a specific number of programs per month (typically 5-7) such as holiday celebrations, community service and social events. Moishe House aims to promote new Jewish leadership by providing young adults the opportunity to create and develop their own communities.
Moishe House focuses on creating community for Jewish young adults by allowing residents to design and lead programs and activities that they deem relevant and interesting, without regard to a specific branch of Judaism.  These programs include Shabbat dinners, social action activities, social events and more.

Impact
The recently published results of a two-year comprehensive evaluation conducted by The TCC Group and sponsored by the Jim Joseph Foundation found that Moishe House's model is having a profound impact on Jewish young adults internationally. The evaluation focused on both Moishe House residents’ and participants’ perceptions and opinions prior to becoming involved with Moishe House and since becoming involved. 
The percentage of participants who reported being aware of local opportunities for Jewish young adults to participate in fun and meaningful activities nearly doubled since becoming involved with Moishe House, while residents overwhelmingly noted that they have gained knowledge and skills related to Jewish traditions and customs. Moreover, residents’ affirmative responses more than tripled when asked if they consider themselves to be leaders in their Jewish community since becoming active in Moishe House. Both residents and participants feel more strongly about leading an active Jewish life since becoming involved with Moishe House.

Moishe House also has an alumni program to keep former residents engaged in the Moishe House community.

Growth
There are more than 100 Moishe Houses in 25+ countries with over 300 residents. Administratively, there are 50+ staff members around the world and three central Moishe House offices:
 Headquarters in Encinitas, California, United States
 East Coast Office in Charlotte, North Carolina, United States
 Moishe House Europe office in London, England
US cities with at least one Moishe House include:

Internationally, there is a Moishe House in:

Supporters

Originally funded solely by Morris B. Squire, Moishe House receives funding from around the world from thousands of individual donors and organizations, such as foundations and Jewish Federations. Moishe House also has a number of national partners.

References

External links 
 

Jewish community organizations
Jewish organizations based in the United States
Organizations based in California
Jewish organizations established in 2006
2006 establishments in California